Achour is both a surname and a given name. Notable people with the name include:

Surname 
 Ahmed Achour (born 1945), Tunisian composer and conductor
 Dallal Merwa Achour (born 1994), Algerian volleyball player
 Doria Achour (born 1991), Tunisian film director and actress
 Fateh Achour, Algerian footballer
 Habib Achour, Tunisian trade unionist
 Hassan Achour, Algerian footballer and manager
 Khaled Achour, Tunisian handball player
 Lotfi Achour, Tunisian writer
 Mohamed Fadhel Ben Achour (1909–1970), Tunisian theologian and writer
 Mouloud Achour, Algerian writer, professor, and journalist
 Sana Ben Achour, Tunisian academic
 Yadh Ben Achour (born 1945), Tunisian lawyer

Given name 
 Achour Fenni, Algerian poet, translator and academician
 Achour Hasni, Algerian handball player

See also
 Dar Ben Achour, a palace in the medina of Tunis
 El Achour, a suburb of the city of Algiers
 Ashura (disambiguation)
 Ashur (disambiguation)